Binibining Pilipinas (abbreviated as Bb. Pilipinas) is a national beauty pageant in the Philippines that selects Filipina representatives to compete in one of the Big Four international beauty pageants: Miss International and selects two other titleholders to participate in minor international pageants such as The Miss Globe and Miss Charm International.

History
Binibining Pilipinas is owned by the Araneta Group of Companies headed by Filipino business magnate Jorge León Araneta, the group's President and CEO, the BPCI Organization is spearheaded by Jorge's wife, national director Stella Marquez-Araneta, with Cochitina Sevilla-Bernardo, artist and entrepreneur, as co-chairperson.

Former Miss Colombia Stella M. Araneta, who became a Miss Universe semi-finalist and the winner of the first Miss International beauty pageant in 1960, is the chairperson of Binibining Pilipinas Charities Incorporated (BPCI), which had been the official national franchise holder of the Miss Universe Organization since 1964 after it was passed on by its predecessor, Miss Philippines, which had been the franchise holder from 1952 to 1963.

The following are the Binibining Pilipinas titleholders throughout the years, including the highlights of their performance in major and minor international pageants.

Winners of Big Four international beauty pageants:
 Four  —  Miss Universe winners: 
Gloria Diaz (1969) • Margarita Moran (1973) • Pia Wurtzbach (2015) • Catriona Gray (2018)
 Five  —  Miss International winners: 
 Aurora Pijuan   (1970) • Melanie Marquez (1979) • Lara Quigaman (2005) • Bea Santiago (2013) • Kylie Verzosa (2016)

Winners of Minor international pageants :
 Two  — Miss Tourism International (Macau version) winners: Joanne Santos (1997) • Yuni Que (1998)
 One —  Miss Tourism International (Anatolya Turkish version) winner: Michelle Cuevas Reyes (2001)
 One — Miss Globe International winner: Maricar Balagtas (2001)
 One  — Miss Tourism International (Black Sea version) winner: Kristine Reyes Alzar (2002)
 One  — Queen of Tourism International winner: Noela Mae Evangelista (2003)
 One  — Miss Supranational winner: Mutya Datul (2013)
 Two  — The Miss Globe winners: Ann Colis (2015) • Maureen Montagne (2021)
 Two  — Miss Intercontinental winners: Karen Gallman (2018) • Cinderella Faye Obeñita (2021)

Gemma Cruz, Miss International 1964, is not part of Binibining Pilipinas when she won the Miss International 1964 title. The first Miss International crown for the Philippines, won by Gemma Cruz in 1964, is a product of the Miss Philippines pageant, the predecessor of the Binibining Pilipinas pageant. Cruz helped BPCI in crowning her successor, Isabel Barnett Santos, to represent the country in the 1965 editional of the pageant.

Although BPCI had acquired the local franchise of the Miss World pageant in 1992, the first crown was won by Megan Young in 2013, which is a product of its successor, Miss World Philippines.

Titles 
Note that the year designates the time Binibining Pilipinas has acquired that particular pageant franchise.

Titleholders

References

External links
 Binibining Pilipinas Official website

Pilipinas
 
1964 establishments in the Philippines
Organizations established in 1964
Beauty pageants in the Philippines
Recurring events established in 1964
Philippines
Philippine awards